Marc Balet is an American creative  and art director, architect, and the former art director of Interview Magazine.

He graduated from RISD in Providence, Rhode Island with a degree in architecture.  In 1975 he was awarded a Prix de Rome in architecture. The Whitney Museum of American Art held a solo exhibition of his work titled Dream Houses.

Balet was the art director of Andy Warhol's Interview Magazine from 1976 until 1987.

He went on to found his own advertising agency (mixedbusiness.com) whose clients have included Anne Klein, Barney's, and Giorgio Armani. In 2015 Balet launched Ouihours an "online magazine and e-commerce site devoted entirely to luxury intimates".

Balet was interviewed on screen in the Netflix docuseries The Andy Warhol Diaries in which he notably called former Interview editor Bob Colacello an "asshole" for having put then United States First Lady Nancy Reagan on the cover of the magazine.

References

Living people
Rhode Island School of Design alumni
Andy Warhol
American architects
Year of birth missing (living people)